Copywriting is the act or occupation of writing text for the purpose of advertising or other forms of marketing. The product, called copy or sales copy, is written content that aims to increase brand awareness and ultimately persuade a person or group to take a particular action.

Copywriters help create billboards, brochures, catalogs, jingle lyrics, magazine and newspaper advertisements, sales letters and other direct mail, scripts for television or radio commercials, taglines, white papers, website and social media posts, and other marketing communications.

Employment

Many copywriters are employed in marketing departments, advertising agencies, public relations firms, copywriting agencies, or are self-employed as freelancers, where clients range from small to large companies.

Advertising agencies usually hire copywriters as part of a creative team, in which they are partnered with art directors or creative directors. The copywriter writes a copy or script for an advertisement, based largely on information obtained from a client. The art director is responsible for visual aspects of the advertisement and, particularly in the case of print work, may oversee production. Either member of the team can come up with the overall idea (typically referred to as the concept) and the process of collaboration often improves the work. Some agencies specialize in servicing a particular industry or sector.
Copywriting agencies combine copywriting with a range of editorial and associated services that may include positioning and messaging consulting, social media, search engine optimization, developmental editing, copy editing, proofreading, fact checking, speechwriting and page layout. Some agencies employ in-house copywriters, while others use external contractors or freelancers.
Digital marketing agencies commonly include copywriters, whether freelance or employees, that focus specifically on digital communication. Sometimes the work of a copywriter will overlap with a content writer as they'll need to write social media advertisements, Google advertisements, online landing pages, and email copy that is persuasive. This new wave of copywriting born of the digital era has made the discipline more accessible. But not without a downside, as globalization has meant some copywriting work has been devalued due to the ease of finding skilled copywriters working at different rates.

Copywriters also work in-house for retail chains, book publishers, or other big firms that advertise frequently. They can also be employed to write advertorials for newspapers, magazines, and broadcasters.

Some copywriters work as independent contractors or freelancers, writing for a variety of clients. They may work at a client's office, a coworking office, a coffeehouse, or remotely from home.

Copywriters are similar to technical writers and the careers may overlap. Broadly speaking, however, technical writing is dedicated to informing and instructing readers rather than persuading them. For example, a copywriter writes an advertisement to sell a car, while a technical writer writes the operator's manual explaining how to use it.

Education
Traditionally, the amount of education needed to become a copywriter was most often a Bachelor's degree in English, advertising, journalism, or marketing. That is still regularly the case for in-house copywriters. However, freelance copywriters today can learn the craft from copywriting courses or mentors. Many clients accept or even prefer writing samples over formal copywriting credentials.

In 2018, the U.S. Bureau of Labor Statistics reported an annual median salary of $62,170 for writers and authors. In 2019, PayScale.com stated that the expected salary for copywriters ranged from $35,000-$73,000.

Famous copywriters

John Emory Powers (1837—1919) was the world's first full-time copywriter. Since then, some copywriters have become well-known within the industry because they founded major advertising agencies, and others because of their lifetime body of work. Many creative artists worked as copywriters before becoming famous in other fields.

David Ogilvy (1911—1999) is known as the father of advertising. He is also famous for his famous quote dedicated to Rolls-Royce cars as he said: "At 60 miles an hour the loudest noise in this new Rolls-Royce comes from the Electric Clock". He has also written some memorable books in the advertising field such as Ogilvy on Advertising and Confessions of an Advertising Man.

Leo Burnett (1891—1971) was named by Time as one of the 100 most influential people of the 20th century. He was the founder of Leo Burnett Worldwide. His memorable Marlboro Man is one of the most successful campaigns ever. His company was acquired by Publicis Groupe in 2002.

There are many ways advertisers try to appeal to their client base and have different types of advertising executions to do so. This includes a straight sell, scientific/technical evidence, demonstration, comparison, testimonial, slice of life, animation, personality symbols, imagery, dramatization, humor, and combinations.

Notable ad campaigns 

 Nike's "Just Do It" — increased Nike's sales from $800 million to more than $9.2 billion in 10 years. 
 California Milk Processor Board's "Got Milk?" — increased milk sales in California and has spawned a lot of parodies since its launch.
 Apple's "Get a Mac" — the Mac vs PC campaign generated 42% market share growth in its first year alone.

Formats

Internet

The Internet has expanded the range of copywriting opportunities to include landing pages and other web content, online advertisements, emails, blogs, social media and other forms of electronic communications.

The Internet has brought new opportunities for copywriters to learn their craft, do research and view others' work. Clients, copywriters and art directors can more readily find each other, making freelancing a viable job option. There are also many new websites that make becoming a freelance copywriter a much more organized process.

Experimenting and ongoing re-evaluation is part of the process.

Search engine optimization (SEO)
Web copy may include among its objectives the achievement of higher rankings in search engines. Originally, this involved the strategic placement and repetition of keywords and phrases on web pages, but writing in a manner that human readers would consider normal, as well as their inclusion into Meta tags, page headings and subheadings.

But times have moved on, and "on-page optimization" now involves the consideration of semantic words and phrases (i.e. those that mean the same or are connected). Copywriting for SEO also includes what is written on pages that link to the page concerned, especially on the text used in the link, but this must not be overdone.  There has been (and continues to be) a great deal of research on the subject as things slowly evolve.

Book publishing
In book publishing, flap copy or jacket flap copy is the summary of a book which appears on the inside of a hardcover dust jacket; back cover copy is similar text, usually briefer, on the outside back cover; and catalog copy is a summary written for a publisher's catalog. This is another way of how copywriting uses writing to persuade the customer to develop interest in the product.

See also

 Advertising
 Communication design
 Email marketing
 Swipe file

References

Communication design
 
Advertising occupations
Journalism occupations